Dinardo Alexis Rodríguez Bueno (born 8 June 1968) is a Dominican retired football striker, who was the scorer of the first ever Dominican goal in World Cup qualification.

Club career
Born in Monte Cristi, Rodríguez moved to Santo Domingo aged 12 where he joined Club Atlético Dominguito. He later became the first Dominican footballer to play professionally when he signed for Uruguyan side Rentistas in 1994 and subsequently became the nation's first professional goalscorer.

International career
Nicknamed Lalo, he made his debut for the Dominican Republic in 1989 and earned 15 caps, scoring 11 goals. His final match was a March 2001 Caribbean Cup match against St Kitts.

Administration
In 2019, Rodríguez became executive director of the professional LDF.

Honours

 Universidad Autónoma de Santo Domingo
Primera División de Republica Dominicana: 1989
 Moca
Primera División de Republica Dominicana: 1995, 1999
 Atlético Pantoja
Primera División de Republica Dominicana: 2000

References

External links

1968 births
Living people
People from Monte Cristi Province
Association football forwards
Dominican Republic footballers
Dominican Republic international footballers
C.A. Rentistas players
Moca FC players
Atlético Pantoja players
Dominican Republic expatriate footballers
Expatriate footballers in Uruguay